Muhammad Ahmad al-Mangoush (born December 29, 1967) was General Secretary of the People's Committee in Libya (prime minister) from 29 December 1997 to 1 March 2000.

See also
List of heads of government of Libya

References
World Statesmen - Libya

Prime Ministers of Libya
Living people
Kabataş Erkek Lisesi alumni
1967 births